The Antillenhuis (English: Antilles' House) was the cabinet of the Minister Plenipotentiary of the Netherlands Antilles in The Hague, the Netherlands. The last Minister Plenipotentiary is Paul Comenencia.

References

External links
Website of 'Het Antillenhuis'

Government of the Netherlands Antilles
Buildings and structures in The Hague